Caladenia leptoclavia, commonly known as the thin-clubbed spider orchid, is a plant in the orchid family Orchidaceae and is endemic to New South Wales. It is a ground orchid with a single hairy leaf and a single pale cream-coloured to yellow flower with dark reddish stripes.

Description
The lateral sepals are a similar size and shape to the dorsal sepal but spread widely and stiffly. Flowering occurs from September to October.

Taxonomy and naming
Caladenia leptoclavia was first formally described by David Jones in 1991 from a specimen collected near Bethungra, and the description was published in Australian Orchid Research. The specific epithet (leptoclavia) is derived from the Ancient Greek word λεπτός leptos meaning "thin" or "slender", and the Latin word clava meaning "club", referring to the thin "clubs" on the sepals.

Distribution and habitat
Thin-clubbed spider orchid has a restricted distribution in New South Wales where it is only known from near Bethungra, Cowra and Eugowra where it grows in forest.

References

leptoclavia
Plants described in 1991
Endemic orchids of Australia
Orchids of New South Wales
Taxa named by David L. Jones (botanist)